Joseph P. Chandler (August 22, 1840 – August 24, 1910) was a member of the Wisconsin State Assembly.

Biography
Chandler was born on August 22, 1840 in Monticello, Missouri. He moved to Wisconsin in 1847, settling in Montfort, Wisconsin.

Career
Chandler was elected to the Assembly in 1902 and chaired the Public Improvements Committee. Additionally, he served as Assessor of Montfort, Chairman of the Grant County, Wisconsin Board of Supervisors and a member of the Grant County, Wisconsin Board. He was a Republican.

References

External links

The Political Graveyard

People from Monticello, Missouri
People from Montfort, Wisconsin
Republican Party members of the Wisconsin State Assembly
County supervisors in Wisconsin
1840 births
1910 deaths
Burials in Wisconsin